Los Angeles Airways (LAA) was a helicopter airline founded in October 1947 and based in Westchester, California, which offered service to area airports throughout Southern California.

History

Los Angeles Airways commenced airmail service on October 1, 1947 followed by scheduled passenger service in November 1954, making it the world's first scheduled
helicopter airline. The main hub was Los Angeles International Airport (LAX) where passengers were flown to and from local area heliports, including Disneyland Resort in Anaheim and the Newporter Resort in Newport Beach. Service was later expanded to Ontario and San Bernardino.
LAA's fleet grew with the acquisition of four Sikorsky S-61's in March 1962; the airline became the first civil operator of the type, at a purchased price of $650,000 each. On October 25, 1965, the Civil Aeronautics Board granted LAA a permanent certificate to continue scheduled passenger airline operations over the greater Los Angeles area. This, in conjunction with their authority from the Federal Aviation Administration to conduct flights under instrument flight rules (IFR), gave the company more flexibility to operate at night and in poor weather. The company considered obtaining the Sikorsky S-64 Skycrane, with detachable passenger sections, but failed to secure financing for the acquisition. In the following years the company suffered two fatal accidents, and with the failure to consummate a contract with Golden West Airlines in which it would have been purchased, Los Angeles Airways ceased operations in 1971.

Aircraft operated

 5 Sikorsky S-51
 7 Sikorsky S-55
 7 Sikorsky S-61L
 2 Sikorsky S-62A
 4 DHC-6 Twin Otter

Accidents

 In January 1949, a Sikorsky S-51 crashed off the terminal annex post office in Downtown Los Angeles, killing pilot Harry Slemmons, 27.
 On July 2, 1951, a Sikorsky S-51 crashed in an orange grove between Pomona, California and Ontario, fatally injuring pilot John De Blau, 29, and civil aeronautics inspector, Wyman Ellis Jr., 44, both of Los Angeles.
 On August 27, 1951, a Sikorsky S-51 shed main rotor blades just prior to landing at Lynwood, coming down on Lynwood Road, and killing pilot Carl D. Crew, 24, of Inglewood, California.
 On May 22, 1968, Los Angeles Airways Flight 841, operating a Sikorsky S-61L, crashed in Paramount, California resulting in the loss of 23 lives.
 On August 14, 1968, Los Angeles Airways Flight 417, crashed in Compton, California resulting in the loss of 21 lives.

See also
 List of helicopter airlines
 List of defunct airlines of the United States

References

External links

 Los Angeles Airways on Airliners.net
Disneyland Heliport
Los Angeles Airways timetables
1958 timetable

 
Defunct airlines of the United States
Defunct companies based in California
Defunct helicopter airlines
Transportation in Los Angeles
Transportation in Los Angeles County, California
Transportation in Orange County, California
Companies based in Los Angeles County, California
Airlines established in 1947
Airlines disestablished in 1971
1947 establishments in California
1971 disestablishments in California
Defunct companies based in Greater Los Angeles
American companies established in 1947
Airlines based in California
American companies disestablished in 1971